Rapport till himlen (lit. "Report to heaven") is a 1994 Swedish mini series directed by Ulf Malmros and starring Johan Widerberg and Lina Englund.

Plot summary 
It's summer and Victor's friends are off to travel by InterRail while Victor stays home working as an announcer for Bingo numbers. After a swimming accident where his heart stops for 12 minutes he is able to see dead people. He meets Anna, a girl who was murdered, and they set out to reveal who killed her. The name of the murderer must be entered into Anna's report to heaven.

Cast 
 Johan Widerberg as Victor
 Lina Englund as Anna
 Stellan Skarsgård as Gary
 Kjell Bergqvist as Allan (The priest)
 Vanna Rosenberg as Sonja
and
Liv Alsterlund as Clara
Malou Bergman as My
 Thorsten Flinck as Pedro
Oscar Franzén as Victor's Friend #2
 Gert Fylking as Mr. Splendid
Per Graffman as Coroner
 Lars Green as Biker Angel
 Robert Gustafsson as The Guarding Cop
 Lena T. Hansson as Doctor
Musse Hasselvall as Victor's Friend #1
 Thomas Hellberg as Chief Superintendent
P.G. Hylén as The Sweaty Man
 Elin Klinga as Lisa
Mattias Knave as The Heaven Man
 Marika Lagercrantz as Victor's Mother
 Yvonne Lombard as Mrs. Landberg, Anna's Grandmother
 Anneli Martini as The Feminist
 Simon Norrthon as Jerry
Ivan Öhlin as Mark
 Kalle Westerdahl as Niklas

External links 
IMDb Entry

Swedish television miniseries
Swedish drama television series
1994 Swedish television series debuts
1994 Swedish television series endings